The sphenozygomatic suture is the cranial suture between the sphenoid bone and the zygomatic bone.

Additional images

References

External links

 
 

Bones of the head and neck
Cranial sutures
Human head and neck
Joints
Joints of the head and neck
Skeletal system
Skull